Horace Stoute (born 29 May 1971) is a former Barbadian international footballer who played as a goalkeeper. He had a brief spell in the Scottish Football League with Livingston, playing 15 league matches for the club between 1994 and 1996.

After leaving Livingston, Stoute returned to his home country to play football before retiring and moving into coaching roles with the Barbados national football team and several domestic clubs.

References

External links
 Player profile at Post War English & Scottish Football League Player's Database
 

1971 births
Living people
Barbadian footballers
Association football goalkeepers
Barbados international footballers
Livingston F.C. players
Scottish Football League players
Expatriate footballers in Scotland
Barbadian expatriate footballers
Barbadian expatriate sportspeople in Scotland